In trigonometry, the law of cotangents is a relationship among the lengths of the sides of a triangle and the cotangents of the halves of the three angles. This is also known as the Cot Theorem. 

Just as three quantities whose equality is expressed by the law of sines are equal to the diameter of the circumscribed circle of the triangle (or to its reciprocal, depending on how the law is expressed), so also the law of cotangents relates the radius of the inscribed circle of a triangle (the inradius) to its sides and angles.

Statement

and furthermore that the inradius is given by

Proof
In the upper figure, the points of tangency of the incircle with the sides of the triangle break the perimeter into 6 segments, in 3 pairs. In each pair the segments are of equal length. For example, the 2 segments adjacent to vertex  are equal. If we pick one segment from each pair, their sum will be the semiperimeter . An example of this is the segments shown in color in the figure.

By inspection of the figure, using the definition of the cotangent function, we have

and similarly for the other two angles, proving the first assertion.

For the second one—the inradius formula—we start from the general addition formula:
 

 
(This is also the triple cotangent identity)

Substituting the values obtained in the first part, we get:

Some proofs using the law of cotangents
A number of other results can be derived from the law of cotangents.

 Heron's formula. Note that the area of  triangle  is also divided into 6 smaller triangles, also in 3 pairs, with the triangles in each pair having the same area.
Mollweide's first formula. From the addition formula and the law of cotangents we have  This gives the result  as required.
Mollweide's second formula. From the addition formula and the law of cotangents we have  Here, an extra step is required to transform a product into a sum, according to the sum/product formula.  This gives the result  as required.
The law of tangents can also be derived from this .

See also
Law of sines
Law of cosines
Law of tangents
Mollweide's formula
Heron's formula

References

 

Trigonometry
Theorems about triangles